Severe Cyclonic Storm Aila (JTWC designation: 02B) was the second named tropical cyclone of the 2009 North Indian Ocean cyclone season. Warned by both the Regional Specialized Meteorological Center (RMSC) and Joint Typhoon Warning Center (JTWC), Aila formed over a disturbance over the Bay of Bengal on May 23, 2009 and started to intensify and organize reaching sustained wind speeds of 110 kmh (70 mph). It was the worst natural disaster to affect Bangladesh since Cyclone Sidr in November 2007. A relatively strong tropical cyclone, it caused extensive damage in India and Bangladesh.

The storm was responsible for at least 4 deaths across Bangladesh and India; more than 1 million people were left homeless. Health officials in Bangladesh confirmed a deadly outbreak of diarrhea on 29 May, with more than 7,000 people being infected and four dying. In Bangladesh, an estimated 20 million people were at risk of post-disaster diseases due to Aila.

Meteorological history

The disturbance at this time had a broad and poorly organized area of deep convection, which was located to the southeast of the low level circulation center which had consolidated into a single circulation during the previous 12 hours. Environmental analysis indicated that the system was in an area of favorable conditions to develop with low vertical wind shear and warm sea surface temperatures. Aila became a severe cyclonic storm at 06UTC on May 25 and made landfall at its peak intensity (60kt, 967hPa) between 08 and 09UTC.

Preparations
Officials in India evacuated thousands of residents from coastal areas ahead of Cyclone Aila. In addition, several warning alerts were issued before the cyclone hit Kolkata; however, no alarm bells were rung.

In the Bhola District of Bangladesh, an estimated 500,000 people evacuated to higher areas and shelters as Aila neared landfall. Tourists were advised to stay in their hotels due to the short amount of time to prepare for the storm.

Impact

India

In India, at least 149 people were killed, two by electrocution, and hundreds others were left homeless as torrential rains led to flooding. High winds uprooted numerous trees, blocking roads throughout the region. More than 15,000 people in eight villages were reportedly isolated from relief crews by severe flooding. At least 18 of the 45 fatalities in West Bengal were in Kolkata, the region where Aila made landfall. All transit systems in the city of Kolkata were halted and daily life was at a standstill due to the storm. The areas and districts affected by the cyclone in West Bengal include East Midnapore, Howrah, Hooghly, Burdwan, South 24 Parganas and Kolkata.
In the West Bengal state, more than 100,000 people were left homeless as a result of Aila. At least 100 river embankments were breached by storm surge produced by the cyclone. Throughout the country, at least 150,000 people were left homeless. In northern areas of the state, heavy rains triggered numerous landslides in Darjeeling that killed 22 people and left 6 others missing. At least 500 homes were also damaged in the area. At least 50,000 hectares of agricultural land was lost during the storm, costing an estimated Rs. 125 crore (US$26.3 million). Throughout the state, an estimated 40,000 homes were destroyed and 132,000 others were damaged. At least 350,000 people affected by Aila. Later reports indicated that upwards of 2.3 million were displaced by the storm as 175,000 homes were destroyed and 270,000 were damaged.

Numerous trees were uprooted and power lines were downed, causing widespread power outages. High waves produced by the storm inundated coastal villages, forcing residents to evacuate to safer areas. Roads were also blocked by floodwaters or debris, hampering relief efforts. An estimated  of Orissa cropland were lost due to Aila.

The remnants of Aila produced gusty winds and heavy rains in the eastern Indian state of Meghalaya between May 25 and 26. Several homes were damaged in the area and power was cut due to fallen trees and power lines. No injuries were reported in the state. Several streets were flooded and some homes were reported to have standing water.

Bangladesh

Torrential rains from Aila resulted in 190 fatalities and at least 7,000 injuries across the Khulna and Satkhira Districts. Approximately 9.3 million people were affected by the cyclone, of which 1 million were rendered homeless. One year after the storm, 200,000 people remained homeless. Total losses amounted to 89.46 billion taka (US$1 billion).

More than 400,000 people were reportedly isolated by severe flooding in coastal regions of Bangladesh. Numerous villages were either completely submerged in floodwaters or destroyed. Dozens of people are reportedly missing throughout the country. A storm surge of  impacted western regions of Bangladesh, submerging numerous villages. Several rivers broke through embankments, causing widespread inland flooding. In Dacope Upazila alone, more than 50,000 people were left homeless. Despite warnings to remain at port, numerous fishing vessels sailed into the storm. Port officials stated that more than 500 fishermen had gone missing since the storm made landfall. In Patuakhali, a dam broke and submerged five villages. Numerous houses were destroyed by the subsequent flooding and tens of thousands of people were left stranded in the villages. In Chandpur, two pontoons sank while docked in port. An estimated 58,950 animals were killed by the storm with up to 50,000 deer missing. On the island of Nizum Dwip, nearly all structures were severely damaged or destroyed, leaving roughly 20,000 people homeless.

Environmental impact
Dozens of the tigers are feared to have drowned in Aila's storm surge along with deer and crocodiles. , one tiger has been found alive; it was found in a waterlogged cowshed following the cyclone's landfall. Additionally the forest remains under an estimated  of water. On 27 May, conservationists have begun a search for the tigers throughout the forest. The search teams were supplied with fresh drinking water for the tigers as their natural water source was inundated with salt water from Aila's storm surge.

Government Steps

India
State Government in co-operation with the central counterparts took up the rescue and the rehabilitation program. Army was deployed to the affected areas. The next day, the army used helicopters to provide food to the affected population. About 2,500 troops were deployed to West Bengal on May 26, 2009. Several naval relief teams were deployed to the Sunderbans region where an estimated 400,000 people were marooned by flooding. Roughly 100 relief camps were established in West Bengal shortly after the storm passed. On 27 May, 400 troops form the National Disaster Response Force were deployed to the state for relief operations. The Government of India released Rs.10 million (US$209,775) in relief funds to the affected areas on 26 May. Two MI-17 helicopters were also sent to air-drop food supplies to the worst affected areas in West Bengal.

Bangladesh
Immediately following the storm, a 33-member team of the Bangladesh Navy was deployed to the affected regions. The Red Cross also quickly responded, supplying water purifying tablets and other relief items. The Deputy Commissioner of Satkhira district allocated ten tonnes of rice and Tk.100,000 (US$1,450) in immediate relief funds for that district. The government later allocated Tk. 1.2 million (US$17,143) and 1,000 tonnes of rice for the affected areas. These amounts further increased to Tk. 12.3 million (US$175,714) and 2,500 tonnes of rice.

Five days following the impacts of Aila, the Bangladeshi Health Organization confirmed that a widespread outbreak of diarrhea which has infected over 7,000 people. Another outbreak of water borne diseases, namely dysentery, has infected over 3,000 people. At least two people have been confirmed to have died from diarrhea and two other fatalities were reported. Officials feared that the outbreak would lead to many fatalities in isolated areas that have not received aid and have been without food and clean water for nearly a week.

In comparison to earlier cyclones, that of similar magnitude, Cyclone Aila caused lower death toll due to implementation of efficient early warning systems, cyclone shelters and disaster relief allocation system. The Government of Bangladesh was praised domestically and internationally for its implementation of effective disaster management projects that have reduced death tolls in Cyclone Aila and future cyclones that have struck the country it since. Cyclone Aila has been described as a benchmark of Bangladesh's success in implementation of effective disaster management system. The joint effort of the Government and NGOs to support the post-disaster recovery was also remarkable but criticized due to lack of comprehensive inclusion of pre-disaster vulnerability reduction measures.

See also
 2009 North Indian Ocean cyclone season
 Cyclone Mora  a strong tropical cyclone in May 2017 that devastated Bangladesh and neighbouring countries.

References

External links

 RSMC New Delhi
 Joint Typhoon Warning Center 

2009 North Indian Ocean cyclone season
Tropical cyclones in India
Tropical cyclones in Bangladesh
2009 in Bangladesh
Severe cyclonic storms
2009 disasters in India
May 2009 events in Asia
Tropical cyclones in 2009